Yamparáez is the seat of Yamparáez Municipality located in the Yamparáez Province in the Chuquisaca Department of Bolivia.  At the time of census 2001 it had 903 inhabitants.

References 

Populated places in Chuquisaca Department